Hodac is a commune in Mureș County, Transylvania, Romania. It is composed of seven villages: Arșița (Ársica), Bicașu (Bikás), Dubiștea de Pădure (Erdődubiste), Hodac, Mirigioaia (Mirigalja), Toaca (Toka), and Uricea (Uricse).

The commune lies on the banks of the Gurghiu River. It neighbors the following communes: Ibănești to the south and east, Lunca Bradului to the north, and Gurghiu to the west.

Natives
Nicolae Pop

See also
List of Hungarian exonyms (Mureș County)

References

Communes in Mureș County
Localities in Transylvania